Stephen Sadove is an American businessman. He is the former chairman and chief executive officer of Saks Incorporated.

Biography

Early life
His father worked for the World Bank. He graduated from Hamilton College in 1973, and received an M.B.A. from the Harvard Business School.

Career
From 1975 to 1991, he worked for General Foods. He served as president of Clairol from 1991 to 1995, where he was responsible for Worldwide Clairol's performance in Canada, Europe, the Middle East, Africa and Latin America. He was president of Worldwide Beauty Care from 1995 to 1998, senior vice president of Bristol-Myers Squibb Company and president of Worldwide Beauty Care and Nutritionals from 1998 to September 2000, and  senior vice president of Bristol-Myers Squibb and president of Bristol-Myers Squibb Worldwide Beauty Care from 1996 to January 2002. From January 2002 to March 2004, he served as vice chairman of Saks. He has been CEO since January 2006 and chairman since May 2007. He serves as chairman of the board of directors and executive committee of the National Retail Federation.

He served on the board of EQ Office. He now sits on the board of directors of Colgate-Palmolive and the restaurant chain Ruby Tuesday. He served as a chairman of the Harvard Business School Club of Greater New York and he sits on the board of trustees of his alma mater, Hamilton College. He has also given lectures to students in the M.B.A. program at the Columbia Business School.

Personal life 
He has admitted to using playing tennis as a networking tool.

References

Living people
Hamilton College (New York) alumni
Harvard Business School alumni
American businesspeople
Bristol Myers Squibb people
Colgate-Palmolive
Year of birth missing (living people)